Richard Wenk (born 1956) is an American film screenwriter and director best known for his work on The Expendables 2 (2012), The Equalizer (2014), and The Magnificent Seven (2016).

Early life
Wenk was born in 1956 in Metuchen, New Jersey. He graduated from Metuchen High School in 1974, and from the New York University Tisch School of the Arts in 1979.

Career
Wenk worked as an assistant to director John Huston on the 1982 film Annie. In 1984, he was recruited by New World Pictures producer Donald P. Borchers to write and direct the black comedy film Vamp (1986). Borchers had been impressed by Wenk's NYU thesis film, a musical vampire comedy short titled Dracula Bites the Big Apple. In 1994, he directed the comedy film Attack of the 5 Ft. 2 In. Women. In 1998, he wrote and directed the film Just the Ticket. In 2002, he directed the slasher film Wishcraft. In 2006, he wrote the script for Richard Donner's last film 16 Blocks. In 2011, he wrote the action film The Mechanic. By 2012, he wrote Simon West's ensemble action film The Expendables 2. In October 2012, he was hired to write the script for the Masters of the Universe reboot.

In 2014, he signed on to write the action film The Equalizer and its two sequels. In 2016, he wrote the action films Countdown, Jack Reacher: Never Go Back, and The Magnificent Seven. In 2017, he was hired to write the script and story for American Renegades. In 2018, Wenk was hired to write the reboot of Universal Soldier. In 2021, he wrote the action thriller film The Protégé. He was announced to be writing the upcoming films Lethal Finale, Kraven the Hunter, and Fast Charlie.

Filmography

References

External links
 

1956 births
Living people
20th-century American male writers
20th-century American screenwriters
21st-century American male writers
21st-century American screenwriters
American male screenwriters
Film directors from New Jersey
Metuchen High School alumni
People from Metuchen, New Jersey
Screenwriters from New Jersey
Tisch School of the Arts alumni